Meador may refer to:

 Meador, Kentucky, a rural unincorporated community in northern Allen County, Kentucky, United States
 Meador, West Virginia, an unincorporated community in Mingo County, West Virginia, United States
 25491 Meador, a main-belt minor planet
 Ed Meador (born 1937), a former American football defensive back
 Joshua Meador (1911–1965), an animator, special effects artist, and animation director for the Disney studio
 Johnny Meador (1892–1970), a pitcher in Major League Baseball